The symponos was, along with the logothetes tou praitoriou, one of the two senior subalterns to the Eparch of Constantinople, the chief administrator of the capital of the Byzantine Empire. His main responsibility was the supervision of the city's guilds on the Eparch's behalf. Earlier scholars suggested that each guild had its own symponos, but this hypothesis has been rejected since. John B. Bury identified him as the successor of the  attested in the late 4th century Notitia Dignitatum, but the earliest surviving seal of a symponos dates to the 6th or 7th centuries. The office is last attested in 1023. According to the Taktikon Uspensky, the symponos and the logothetes tou praitoriou preceded, rank-wise, the chartoularioi of the Byzantine themes and domesticates, but were beneath the rank of spatharios.

References

Sources
 
 

Administration of Constantinople
Byzantine fiscal offices